A hot tower is a tropical cumulonimbus cloud that reaches out of the lowest layer of the atmosphere, the troposphere, and into the stratosphere. These formations are called "hot" because of the large amount of latent heat released as water vapor condenses into liquid and freezes into ice within the cloud.  Hot towers in regions of sufficient vorticity may acquire rotating updrafts; these are known as vortical hot towers In some instances, hot towers appear to develop characteristics of a supercell, with deep and persistent rotation present in the updraft. The role of hot towers in tropical weather was first formulated by Joanne Simpson in 1958. Hot towers dominated discussions in tropical meteorology in the 1960s and are now considered the main drivers of rising air within tropical cyclones and a major component of the Hadley circulation. Although the prevalence of hot towers in scientific literature decreased in the 1970s, hot towers remain an active area of research. The presence of hot towers in tropical cyclones is correlated with an increase in the tropical cyclones's intensities.

Observation 
Hot towers were first detected by radar in the 1950s. Aerial reconnaissance was used to probe hot towers, though planes avoided the most dangerous cores of hot towers due to safety concerns. The launch of the Tropical Rainfall Measuring Mission (TRMM) in 1997 provided the resolution and coverage necessary to systematically catalog hot towers and precisely assess their structure globally. Prior to 1997, the small size and short duration of hot towers limited studies of hot towers to aerial observations as the resolutions of satellite sensors at microwave and infrared wavelengths were too coarse to properly resolve details within hot towers.

Structure 
The term hot tower has been applied to both rapidly rising parcels of air and the tall cumulonimbus clouds that accompany them. Hot towers are effectively undilute; as they ascend, the surrounding air does not mix with the rising parcels of air. As a result, the equivalent potential temperature within a hot tower remains nearly constant throughout their entire vertical extent. This allows for efficient transport of heat from the lower troposphere to the stratosphere. Hot towers forming within areas of rotation may feature rotating updrafts; these are known as vortical hot towers and are associated with localized regions of anomalous vertical vorticity.

Conceptual development 

Before the 1950s, the mechanism driving atmospheric Hadley cells—an air circulation that transports tropical heat and moisture poleward—was poorly understood. It was initially believed that the Hadley cell was fueled by the broad, diffuse, and gradual rise of warm and moist air near the equator. However calculations of Earth's energy budget using data from World War II showed that the mid-troposphere was an energy deficit region, indicating that the maintenance of the Hadley cell could not be explained by the broad ascent of air. The role of the tropical regions in the global climate system and the development of tropical disturbances were also poorly understood. The 1950s marked a pivotal decade that saw the advancement of tropical meteorology, including the creation of the U.S. National Hurricane Research Project in 1956. In 1958, Herbert Riehl and Joanne Simpson proposed that the release of latent heat caused by condensation within hot towers supplied the energy necessary to maintain Hadley cells and the trade winds; their hypothesis was initially based on aerial observations made by Simpson during her time at Woods Hole Oceanographic Institution. This mechanism required the existence of undilute cumulonimbus clouds that did not entrain the surrounding air, allowing for the efficient transfer of heat from the ocean surface into the upper troposphere. The existence of 1,500–2,500 of these clouds was required if they were to support the Hadley circulation. The researchers also argued that hot towers helped maintain the warmth present at the center of tropical cyclones and that the ascent of moist air within tropical cyclones was concentrated around the hot towers. In their original 1958 paper outlining the role of hot towers, Riehl and Simpson described these clouds as "narrow warm towers", but began terming the idea as the "hot tower hypothesis" by 1960. For the next two decades, hot towers dominated scientific discussion concerning the interaction between cumulus clouds and their larger-scale tropical environments.

Aerial observations of Hurricane Daisy in 1958 suggested that convection within tropical cyclones was limited to a few areas of cumulonimbus clouds, dispelling the idea that rising air was distributed throughout the entire cyclone's envelope and lending support for the hot tower hypothesis. In the case of Hurricane Daisy, the convecting cumulonimbus clouds represented only about four percent of the total region of precipitation associated with the hurricane. A 1961 analysis by Riehl and Simpson using the NHRP data from Hurricane Daisy concluded that hot towers were the principal mechanism by which tropical cyclones move warm air into the upper troposphere. The newfound importance of hot towers in tropical cyclones motivated the development of parametrization—the representation of small-scale phenomena and interactions, i.e. individual cumulus clouds—in early weather models. The hot tower hypothesis also inspired the development of convective instability of the second kind (CISK): a conceptual model that emphasized the feedbacks between the latent heat released by individual cumuli and the convergence associated with tropical cyclones. By the 1970s, many of the ideas and predictions put forth by the hot tower hypothesis had been validated by empirical observations. Critics of the hot tower hypothesis contended it was implausible that a cumulonimbus cloud could be free of entrainment. This facet of the hypothesis remained untested until dropsondes released into hot towers as part of the Convection and Moisture Experiment in 1998 provided the first direct measurements of the thermodynamic structure of hot towers. The data showed that the equivalent potential temperature within hot towers was virtually constant across their entire vertical extent, confirming the lack of entrainment. Scientific research of hot towers experienced a resurgence in the 2000s with a renewed focus on their role in tropical cyclogenesis and tropical cyclone development.

Effect on tropical cyclones 
Vortical hot towers aid in the formation of tropical cyclones by producing many small-scale positive anomalies of potential vorticity, which eventually coalesce to strengthen the broader storm. The high vorticity present in the hot towers traps the latent heat released by those clouds, while the merger of the hot towers aggregates this enhanced warmth. These processes are the major part of the initial formation of a tropical cyclone's warm core—the anomalous warmth at the center of such a system—and the increased angular momentum of the winds encircling the developing cyclone.

In 2007, the National Aeronautics and Space Administration (NASA) hypothesized that the wind shear between the eye and the eyewall could enhance updraft through the center of a cyclone and generate convection. Hot towers may appear when a cyclone is about to intensify, possibly rapidly. A particularly tall hot tower rose above Hurricane Bonnie in August 1998, as the storm intensified before striking North Carolina.

See also 

 List of cloud types
 Pileus
 Overshooting top
 Rapid intensification

References

Bibliography

External links
Hurricane Multimedia Gallery – a hurricane multimedia page.
UCAR slides: "Hot Towers and Hurricanes: Early Observations, Theories and Models"

Weather hazards
Tropical cyclone meteorology
Articles containing video clips
Cloud and fog physics